The μ-opioid receptors (MOR) are a class of opioid receptors with a high affinity for enkephalins and beta-endorphin, but a low affinity for dynorphins. They are also referred to as μ(mu)-opioid peptide (MOP) receptors. The prototypical μ-opioid receptor agonist is morphine, the primary psychoactive alkaloid in opium and for which the receptor was named, with mu being the Greek letter m. It is an inhibitory G-protein coupled receptor that activates the Gi alpha subunit, inhibiting adenylate cyclase activity, lowering cAMP levels.

Structure 
The structure of the μ-opioid receptor has been determined with the antagonist β-FNA, the agonist BU72, and in a complex with DAMGO and Gi protein.

Splice variants
Three variants of the μ-opioid receptor are well characterized, though RT-PCR has identified up to 10 total splice variants in humans.

Location
They can exist either presynaptically or postsynaptically depending upon cell types.

The μ-opioid receptors exist mostly presynaptically in the periaqueductal gray region, and in the superficial dorsal horn of the spinal cord (specifically the substantia gelatinosa of Rolando). Other areas where they have been located include the external plexiform layer of the olfactory bulb, the nucleus accumbens, in several layers of the cerebral cortex, and in some of the nuclei of the amygdala, as well as the nucleus of the solitary tract.

Some MORs are also found in the intestinal tract. Activation of these receptors inhibits peristaltic action which causes constipation, a major side effect of μ agonists.

Activation
MOR can mediate acute changes in neuronal excitability via suppression of presynaptic release of GABA. Activation of the MOR leads to different effects on dendritic spines depending upon the agonist, and may be an example of functional selectivity at the μ-receptor.  The physiological and pathological roles of these two distinct mechanisms remain to be clarified.  Perhaps, both might be involved in opioid addiction and opioid-induced deficits in cognition.

Activation of the μ-opioid receptor by an agonist such as morphine causes analgesia, sedation, slightly reduced blood pressure, itching, nausea, euphoria, decreased respiration, miosis (constricted pupils), and decreased bowel motility often leading to constipation. Some of these effects, such as analgesia, sedation, euphoria, itching and decreased respiration, tend to lessen with continued use as tolerance develops. Miosis and reduced bowel motility tend to persist; little tolerance develops to these effects.

The canonical MOR1 isoform is responsible for morphine-induced analgesia, whereas the alternatively spliced MOR1D isoform (through heterodimerization with the gastrin-releasing peptide receptor) is required for morphine-induced itching.

Deactivation
As with other G protein-coupled receptors, signalling by the μ-opioid receptor is terminated through several different mechanisms, which are upregulated with chronic use, leading to rapid tachyphylaxis. The most important regulatory proteins for the MOR are the β-arrestins arrestin beta 1 and arrestin beta 2, and the RGS proteins RGS4, RGS9-2, RGS14, and RGSZ2.

Long-term or high-dose use of opioids may also lead to additional mechanisms of tolerance becoming involved. This includes downregulation of MOR gene expression, so the number of receptors presented on the cell surface is actually reduced, as opposed to the more short-term desensitisation induced by β-arrestins or RGS proteins. Another long-term adaptation to opioid use can be upregulation of glutamate and other pathways in the brain which can exert an opioid-opposing effect, so reduce the effects of opioid drugs by altering downstream pathways, regardless of MOR activation.

Tolerance and overdoses
Fatal opioid overdose typically occurs due to bradypnea, hypoxemia, and decreased cardiac output (hypotension occurs due to vasodilation, and bradycardia further contributes to decreased cardiac output). A potentiation effect occurs when opioids are combined with ethanol, benzodiazepines, barbiturates, or other central depressants which can result in rapid loss of consciousness and an increased risk of fatal overdose.

Substantial tolerance to respiratory depression develops quickly, and tolerant individuals can withstand larger doses. However, tolerance to respiratory depression is quickly lost during withdrawal and may be completely reversed within a week. Many overdoses occur in people who return to their previous dose after having lost their tolerance following cessation of opioids. This puts addicts who receive medical treatment for opioid addiction at great risk of overdose when they are released, as they may be particularly vulnerable to relapse.

Less commonly, massive overdoses have been known to cause circulatory collapse from vasodilation and bradycardia.

Opioid overdoses can be rapidly reversed through the use of opioid antagonists, naloxone being the most widely used example. Opioid antagonists work by binding competitively to µ-opioid receptors and displacing opioid agonists. Additional doses of naloxone may be necessary and supportive care should be given to prevent hypoxic brain injury by monitoring vital signs.

Tramadol and tapentadol carry additional risks associated with their dual effects as SNRIs and can cause serotonin syndrome and seizures. Despite these risks, there is evidence to suggest that these drugs have a lower risk of respiratory depression compared to morphine.

See also 
 δ-opioid receptor
 κ-opioid receptor

References

External links 
 
 
 

Opioid receptors
Human proteins